Evening Bells is a 1986 Yugoslav film directed by Lordan Zafranović, starring Rade Šerbedžija and Neda Arnerić.

References

External links

1986 films
Croatian war drama films
1980s Croatian-language films
Yugoslav war drama films
Films directed by Lordan Zafranović
Jadran Film films
Films based on novels